Ratburger is a children's book written by David Walliams, and illustrated by Tony Ross. It is the fifth book by Walliams.

Plot
The story follows a young girl named Zoe, whose mother died when she was a baby. Zoe now lives in a council flat with her father and her lazy stepmother, Sheila. Zoe is being bullied by a classmate named Tina Trotts and is looked down upon by a teacher, Miss Midge. She is also suspicious of Burt, who sells burgers to schoolchildren from his van.

A couple of years prior, Zoe's father bought Zoe a hamster as a birthday present, and she named it Gingernut. The hamster dies in suspicious circumstances, and Zoe suspects that Sheila is responsible. Shortly afterward, Zoe finds a rat that has sneaked into her room, and discovers that it is intelligent and can dance to music. Zoe names the rat Armitage (after the name of a plumbing company which she finds on a toilet bowl), but he is seen by her headmaster and her history teacher Miss Midge, who insists that Zoe should be suspended.

Zoe goes to see Raj, the owner of her local newsagents, and tells him everything. Raj is shocked to learn of Zoe's suspension and is scared of Armitage, advising Zoe to set him free. Zoe does so, but Armitage comes back, convincing her that he wants to live with her.

Sheila learns of Zoe's suspension and tries to force her to give Armitage to the blind burger seller Burt (who at which point is pretending to be a pest-control man). Zoe denies having a rat, but Burt sniffs him out, and Zoe is sent to her room. She tries to escape by digging a hole through the wall of her room into the neighbouring flat, but this leads to Tina Trott's bedroom. Escaping from Tina, Zoe follows and spies on Burt, discovering that his burgers are made out of rats he has captured. Burt finds her  and eventually tells her why he hates rats: when he worked at a laboratory, he was bitten by a rat which gave him such a shock that he spilled acid onto his eyes, burning them out.

Zoe finds her father in his local pub, The Executioner & Axe. Zoe's father accompanies Zoe to the warehouse where Burt keeps his rats and burger-making machine.  Since they are not able to tell which of the captive rats is Armitage, Zoe and her father free them all. Then Burt and Sheila arrive with Armitage and threaten to throw Armitage, Zoe and her father into the burger-making machine. In the ensuing struggle, Burt and Sheila overbalance into the machine and are minced and turned into burgers, which the rats then eat.

Taking Armitage with them, Zoe and her father escape in Burt's van. Her father subsequently converts the vehicle into an ice cream van and launches his own company, Armitage's Ices, so that he can pursue his dream of making and selling ice cream with new flavours that he has invented. These prove popular with the local schoolchildren and the business is a success. Meanwhile, Zoe has discovered that Tina is being bullied by her father. Tina apologises to Zoe for bullying her in return, and the two become friends. The next day, Zoe's suspension is lifted and she and Armitage perform at the school talent show with Tina.

Adaptation
On 22 February 2017, David Walliams confirmed on Twitter that Ratburger was being adapted for British broadcaster Sky UK.

It was broadcast on Sky One at 18:00 on 24 December 2017.

The film starred:
Talia Barnett as Zoe
David Walliams as Burt
Sheridan Smith as Sheila
Mark Benton as Gary
Tillie Amartey as Tina Trotts
Nigel Planer as Headmaster
Ben Bailey Smith as Charlie Jacob
Sarah Hadland as DC Grey
Harish Patel as Raj
Sophie Thompson as Miss Maxwell
George Kent as Harry
Charlotte Marsh as Jemma
Jocelyn Jee Esien as WPC Budd
Sophie Riley as Jade
Sally Plumb as Linda 
Andi Peters as Presenter 
Robyn Payne Cooper as Kayleigh 
Chris Ellison as Landlord

References 

Novels by David Walliams
British children's novels
British novels adapted into films
Fiction about animal cruelty
2012 British novels
2012 children's books
HarperCollins books